Tatro is a surname. Notable people with the surname include:

Duane Tatro (1927–2020), American composer
Dustin Tatro (1927–2020), American stadium organist
Jimmy Tatro (born 1992), American actor, comedian, writer, and YouTube personality

English-language surnames